Events from the year 1924 in Denmark.

Incumbents
 Monarch - Christian X
 Prime minister - Niels Neergaard (until 24 April), Thorvald Stauning

Events

Undated

Sports
 23 July  Esbjerg fB is founded.

Date unknown
 B 1903 wins their second Danish football championship by defeating B 1913 50 in the second replay of the final of the 1923–24 Danish National Football Tournament (after two 11 draws).

Births
 7 January  Karen Strand, silversmith (died 2000)
14 August - Holger Juul Hansen, actor (died 2013)
10 November - Klaus Baess, Olympic sailor (died 2018) 
29 November - Erik Balling, TV and film director (died 2005)
 2 December - Else Marie Pade, composer (died 2016) 
 7 December – Bent Fabricius-Bjerre (a.k.a. Bent Fabric), composer, pianist (died 2020)
 29 December – Gurli Vibe Jensen, missionary, priest and writer (died 2016)

Deaths
 18 March – Walter Christmas, author (b. 1861)
 19 September – Hannibal Sehested, prime minister of Denmark (b. 1842)
 7 December – Rudolph Sophus Bergh, composer (b. 1859)

References

 
Denmark
Years of the 20th century in Denmark
1920s in Denmark
1924 in Europe